Saturday Morning: Cartoons' Greatest Hits is a tribute album of songs from Saturday morning children's television shows and cartoons (mostly) from the 1960s and 1970s. The project was produced by Ralph Sall, with the songs performed by alternative rock artists. It was released in 1995 by MCA on LP, cassette, and CD, and peaked at #67 on the Billboard 200.  Promotion for the album included a comic book from Marvel Comics and a music video collection hosted by Drew Barrymore (MCA Home Video MCAV-11348).

Track listing

Album credits
All tracks produced by Ralph Sall for Bulletproof Recording Company Inc.
Executive Producer/Concept: Ralph Sall for Bulletproof Recording Company Inc.
Engineered by Peter McCabe and Larry Fergusson.
Mixed by Peter McCabe, Larry Ferguson and Ralph Sall.
Assistants: Ian Bryan, Amado Carrasco, Carlos Castro, Jim Champagne Gabe Chiesa, Dave Cook, Caram Costanzo, Jeff deMorris, Dave Dysart, Andrew Garver, Brad Haehnel, Richard Hijredia, Leslie Ann Jones, Jeffrey Lane, Eddie Miller, Jonathan Mooney. Carl Nappa, Luis Quine, Adam Rhodes, Rail Rogut, Mi Hael Scotella, Dave Schiffman, Krish Sharma, Bill Smith, Rick Roone, Mark Yeend, and Adam Zimmerman.
Mastered by Stephen Marcussen at Precision Mastering, Los Angeles, California.
A&R Direction for MCA Records: Ron Oberman and Beth Halper
Project Coordinators: Candi Tobaben and Jeanne Venton
Liner Notes/Art Direction: Ralph Sall
Design: Lisa Sutton
Front Cover Illustration: Glenn Barr
Tray Card Illustration: Andrew Davis
Back Cover Illustration: Gary Panter
Saturday Morning Logo: Bongo Tone, Inc.

Certifications

Sources

References

1995 compilation albums
MCA Records compilation albums
Alternative rock compilation albums
Tribute albums